Gary Thomas Parris (born June 13, 1950), is a former professional American football tight end. He played for three different teams from 1973–1980, including the San Diego Chargers, Cleveland Browns and St. Louis (Arizona) Cardinals.

Early life 

Parris was born June 13, 1950, in East St. Louis, Illinois. He later moved to Vero Beach, Florida. He attended Vero Beach High School, where he started playing football, earning the Indian River County Athlete of the Century Award.

Parris helped start a Florida Flag Football dynasty by playing with the Palace (WCTV) team from Tallahassee, which won their first state championship in 1971. The team went on to win four consecutive championships. To date, this record has not been surpassed.

He is an Eagle Scout. Parris graduated from Vero Beach High School, in 1969 and played at Florida State University.

Adulthood 

Parris served on the Vero Beach City Council from 1984 to 1986 and ran for the Indian River County, Florida Commission District 3 seat in 2008, losing to incumbent Gary C. Wheeler.

Parris has served as president on several local committees and organizations including Indian River County Little League, Fighting Indians Football Booster Club, Fighting Indians Baseball Booster Club, the March of Dimes Fundraising Committee, Cubmaster of Cub Scout Pack 515 and District Chairman for Boy Scouts of America Indian River District of the Gulf Stream Council. Parris served as a deacon at First Baptist Church of Vero Beach.

Parris served in the U.S. Army National Guard for 6 years.

Parris is employed as a citrus and produce broker with Sunny Fresh Citrus. He calls the football and basketball games for the Vero Beach High School Fighting Indians on Christian FM (WSCF 91.9 FM Vero Beach, 96.3 FM Port St. Lucie) with his sons. Gary is also an announcer for the University of Central Florida football team.

References 

1950 births
Living people
Sportspeople from East St. Louis, Illinois
American football tight ends
Florida State Seminoles football players
San Diego Chargers players
Cleveland Browns players
St. Louis Cardinals (football) players
Vero Beach High School alumni